Illart Zuazubiskar Gallastegi (born 2 February 1990) is a Spanish track cyclist. He competed at the 2015, 2016, 2018, 2020 and 2021 UCI Track Cycling World Championships.

Major results

Track

2012
 National Championships
2nd Individual pursuit
2nd Team pursuit
2013
 2nd Individual pursuit, National Championships
2014
 National Championships
2nd Individual pursuit
2nd Madison
2nd Team pursuit
2016
 National Championships
2nd Team pursuit
3rd Madison
2017
 3rd Team pursuit, National Championships
2018
 National Championships
2nd Team pursuit
3rd Omnium
3rd Madison
2020
 1st  Madison, National Championships (with Xabier Azparren )
2021
 1st  Madison, National Championships (with Telmo Semperena)

Road
2011
 5th Time trial, National Under-23 Road Championships
2014
 1st Stage 1 (TTT) Tour de Gironde
2016
 1st Stage 1 Vuelta a Cantabria
 1st Stage 1 (TTT) Tour of Galicia

References

External links

1990 births
Living people
Spanish track cyclists
Spanish male cyclists
Cyclists from the Basque Country (autonomous community)
People from Durango, Biscay
European Games competitors for Spain
Cyclists at the 2019 European Games
Sportspeople from Biscay